William Robert Serena (October 2, 1924 – April 17, 1996) was a professional baseball player who played infielder in the Major Leagues from  to  for the Chicago Cubs.

After his playing career was over, Serena worked as a baseball scout.

References

External links

1924 births
1996 deaths
Atlanta Braves scouts
Baseball players from California
Buffalo Bisons (minor league) players
Chicago Cubs players
Cleveland Indians scouts
Dallas Eagles players
Dallas Rebels players
Lubbock Hubbers players
Major League Baseball infielders
Miami Marlins scouts
Montgomery Rebels players
Oakland Oaks (baseball) players
Sportspeople from Alameda, California
San Francisco Seals (baseball) players